Jarrod Molloy (born 12 May 1976) is a former Australian rules footballer in the Australian Football League.

A key position player, Molloy was trialled in both attack and defence as his career progressed, with most success enjoyed near the goalmouth.

Although he had some success with both Fitzroy and Brisbane, Molloy hit his straps upon reaching Collingwood. He immediately assumed the role of a club leader, and surprised many in finishing runner up to Paul Licuria in the 2001 Copeland Trophy.

At the end of 2003, Molloy announced his retirement from the game at the age of 28, citing the desire to be able to walk properly on his troublesome ankles. He currently provides special comments for ABC football radio.

He is the son of former Fitzroy defender and VFA coach Shane Molloy and his niece, Chloe Molloy plays for Sydney Swans women's.

References

External links

1976 births
Living people
Fitzroy Football Club players
Brisbane Lions players
Collingwood Football Club players
Box Hill Football Club players
Australian rules footballers from Victoria (Australia)
Northern Knights players
Australia international rules football team players